McNary High School is a public high school located in Keizer, Oregon, United States. It is named for Charles L. McNary, a U.S. Senator who was from the Keizer area.

Academics

Although McNary High School is one of eight high schools in the Salem-Keizer School District, it remains the only high school in Keizer.

Statewide standardized testing in Oregon has exposed a need for improvement in McNary's Mathematics department. With the first year of implementation of "Group Math" in 2005, McNary ranked in the 26th percentile in the state. As of 2021, the school is in the 36th percentile for Mathematics. McNary's English department continues to show improvement: it is in the 53rd percentile in reading, and 64th percentile in writing (2006). Both the Math and English departments have made efforts in implementing support classes and labs to assist struggling students in meeting academic benchmarks.  The Oregon Department of Education school report cards for 2006-2007 gave McNary High School its first "strong" rating - an honor shared by only one other high school in the district. Since then, McNary Senior High School has been unsteadily improving. In the 2010–2011 school year, the school received a "needs improvement" grade on its report card. In the 2011–2012 school year, the school received an "outstanding" on its report card.

In 2008, 83% of the school's seniors received a high school diploma. Of 444 students, 368 graduated, 47 dropped out, and 29 were still in high school the following year.

In 2021, the graduation rate was 91%.

Athletics 
McNary's athletic teams are nicknamed the Celtics or Celts.  For a time, the girls' teams used the nickname "Lady Celts", but have since dropped the gender-centric term.  All teams, whether boys or girls, use the same nickname.  Throughout the history of the athletic department McNary has competed in the highest OSAA class. There are two variations to the Celtic mascot, male and female.

Football
McNary's success on the gridiron came under the direction of coach Tom Smythe. McNary's 51 points in the 1997 championship game were, at that time, the highest single-game record for a 4A title game, besting the 47 points scored by The Dalles in 1947. The 99 points tallied by both McNary and Beaverton in that 1997 championship game shattered the previous record of 59, established in Marshfield's 40–19 win over Medford in 1956, and remains the highest aggregate score for a championship game at any level in Oregon. 
 1997 4A Champion (defeated Beaverton, 51–48)
 2001 4A Champion (defeated Sheldon, 35–10)

Boys' basketball
 1968 A-1 Champion (defeated Lake Oswego 44-42)

Baseball
Baseball is arguably McNary's most successful athletic program, as the team has appeared in six state championship games and won three state championships.  Head coaches Vic Backlund (1989) and Craig Nicholas (2009) have each garnered state coach of the year honors.  
 1983 AAA Runner-up (lost to Klamath Union 4-5)
 1984 AAA Runner-up (lost to Medford 3-6)
 1989 AAA Champion (defeated Wilson 3-2)
 1992 4A Champion (defeated Pendleton 7-4)
 1999 4A Runner-up (lost to Lakeridge 3-6)
 2009 6A Champion (defeated Roseburg 5-1)

Cheerleading
 2001 4A co-ed Runner-up
 2005 co-ed Champion (since 2003, all co-ed teams compete for one championship regardless of school size)

Boys' golf
 1970 A-1 Runner-up
 Jeff McRae - 1970 Individual Champion

Girls' golf
 2005 4A Runner-up
 Jerilyn White - 1996 Individual co-Champion
 Rebecca Kim - 2004 & 2005 Individual Champion

Softball
 1990 3A co-Champion (tied with Milwaukie 1-1; game called after 7 innings due to rain)
 1991 4A Runner-up (lost to Churchill 0-7)
 2004 4A State Champions (Eugene, Oregon)

Boys' and girls' swimming
No team has won a championship, but four swimmers have won Individual Championships.
 Seth Pepper - 1989, 100 yd butterfly
 Jake Palmer - 1997, 50 yd freestyle
 Amber Boucher - 2006, 50 yd freestyle
 Ryan Miller - 2015, 500 yd freestyle

Boys' and girls' track and field
The Celtics have recorded a total of six Individual Championships, three of which were in the high jump (1969, 1970, 2004).
 Mike Fleer - 1969 & 1970, high jump
 Leonard Panther - 1971, long jump
 Phillip Alexander - 2003, 200m & 400m dash
 Monica Groves - 2004, high jump

Wrestling
Although the Celtics have had limited success as a team, the wrestling program has produced a number of individual champions, none more notable than Howard Harris, 1980 NCAA heavyweight champion at Oregon State University. Most of McNary's success came under the leadership of head coach Jerry Lane, the school's first wrestling coach and 1996 inductee into the National Wrestling Hall of Fame.  
 1975 AAA Champion
 1976 AAA Runner-up

Ten wrestlers have accounted for eleven Individual Championships.
 Ron Boucher – 1972, 130 lbs
 Sam Hewitt – 1974, 136 lbs
 Stace Stone – 1975, 115 lbs
 Howard Harris – 1976, 191 lbs
 Loren Quest – 1983, 157 lbs
 Dan Brinlee – 1992, 178 lbs
 Rudy Ramirez – 1993, 130 lbs
 Sean Santana – 2002, 135 lbs & 2003, 140 lbs
 Levi Martinez – 2010, 112 lbs
 Wes Heredia – 2011, 215 lbs

Publications 
McNary has two major forms of media: the Celtic Network News (CNN; formerly known as "Celtic Student Network"), the school's video announcements, and The Piper, the school newspaper. CNN is a student-run news segment produced by the Media Productions Workshop class, and was formerly aired on repeat on two large TVs in the school's commons.

Demographics 
As of 2021, the total minority enrollment at McNary was 43.8%. Of that, 33% are Hispanic, 6.4% are Two or More races, 1.4% are Asian, 1.4% Native Hawaiian/Pacific Islander, 1% American Indian/Alaska Native, and 0.9% Black. 56.2% are White. Additionally, 53% of McNary students are considered economically disadvantaged. 43% of total students are on the free lunch program.

Notable alumni 
 Austin Bibens-Dirkx (born 1985) - Major League Baseball player for the Texas Rangers in 2017.
 Grayson "The Professor" Boucher (born 1984) - streetball player, player on the AND1 Mixtape Tour Gray is not an alumnus—he graduated from Salem Academy 
 Howard Harris (born 1958) - wrestler, member of the 1980 United States Olympic team

References

Keizer, Oregon
High schools in Marion County, Oregon
Educational institutions established in 1965
Public high schools in Oregon
1965 establishments in Oregon